Aagam is a 2016 Tamil-language film directed by debutante  Vijay Anand Sriram and starring Irfan and Deekshitha  . It Was Dubbed In Hindi As Corporate Criminal.

Cast 

 Irfan as Sai
 Deekshitha as Janani
 Riyaz Khan as  Akilesh Acharya
 Jayaprakash as Dr. Sriram
 Y. Gee. Mahendra as Acharya 
 Balaji as Partha - Narrator
 Sriranjini as Sai's mother
 Jeeva Ravi as Sai's father
 Arjunan
 Prem
 Ravi Raja
 TSR 
 Aliona Munteanu
 Sriram (cameo appearance)

Production 
The film is directed by Sriram who worked as an assistant director on Thani Oruvan (2015). Irfan was signed to play an MBA student who exposes a money scam. Deekshitha was signed as the heroine with Riyaz Khan as the antagonist. Jayaprakash and French actress Aliona Munteanu was roped in to play an important role.

Soundtrack
Soundtrack was composed by Vishal Chandrasekhar.
"Muttalae" - Anthony Daasan, Senthildass Velayutham
"Tholaindaen" - Jagadeesh 
"Fly By" - Shilpa Natarajan 
"Aagam" - Mickey, JC

Release 
The Deccan Chronicle gave the film two out of five stars and wrote that " One gets a documentary feel at times, which takes away sheen". The Times of India gave the film one-and-a-half out of five stars and wrote that  "We only wish that everything about this film wasn’t so confusing – starting with the story line, the back stories, the mind-boggling amount of actual ‘science’ in the film, brain mapping".

References

External links 

2016 directorial debut films
Films scored by Vishal Chandrasekhar